Harriet Maxine Hageman (born October 18, 1962) is an American politician and attorney serving as the U.S. representative for Wyoming's at-large congressional district since 2023. She is a member of the Republican Party.

A Wyoming native, Hageman holds degrees from the University of Wyoming and has spent her career as a trial attorney. She unsuccessfully ran for the Republican nomination for governor of Wyoming in 2018 and later served as a member of the Republican National Committee. With the endorsement of former president Donald Trump, Hageman later defeated incumbent representative Liz Cheney, a Trump critic and vice chair of the House January 6 Committee, by a landslide in the 2022 Republican primary election, garnering over twice as many votes as Cheney while spending less than a quarter of Cheney's campaign expenditures.

Hageman was sworn into Congress on January 3, 2023. She voted for Kevin McCarthy on every ballot in the 2023 Speaker of the House election.

Early life and education 
Harriet Maxine Hageman was born on a ranch outside of Fort Laramie, Wyoming, near the Nebraska border, on October 18, 1962. Her father, James Hageman, served as a longtime member of the Wyoming House of Representatives. She is a fourth-generation Wyomingite; her great-grandfather moved to the then-Wyoming Territory from Texas in 1878.

After graduating from Fort Laramie High School, Hageman earned a Bachelor of Science degree in business administration from the University of Wyoming and a Juris Doctor from the University of Wyoming College of Law.

Legal career 
Hageman served as a law clerk for Judge James E. Barrett of the United States Court of Appeals for the Tenth Circuit. She has since worked as a trial attorney. In 1997, Hageman represented Wyoming in Nebraska v. Wyoming, a dispute over management of the North Platte River. In the case, she advocated against the United States Forest Service's roadless rule. In the 2016 Republican Party presidential primaries, Hageman supported U.S. Senator Ted Cruz and criticized Donald Trump.

Hageman was a candidate in the 2018 Wyoming gubernatorial election, placing third after investment manager Foster Friess and the eventual winner, state Treasurer Mark Gordon. Hageman was the Republican National Committeewoman for Wyoming in 2020 and 2021.

U.S. House of Representatives

Elections

2022 

On September 9, 2021, Hageman announced her candidacy for Wyoming's at-large congressional district, challenging three-term incumbent Liz Cheney for the Republican nomination in the 2022 election. In her campaign announcement, Hageman claimed that Cheney no longer represented the people of Wyoming due to her opposition to Trump's efforts to overturn the 2020 election. Noting that Trump had carried Wyoming by landslide majorities in both of his campaigns, Hageman said that by opposing Trump, Cheney "betrayed Wyoming, she betrayed this country, and she betrayed me". She formally launched her campaign at a Cheyenne hotel later that day, saying that Wyoming needed someone in Congress "who represents Wyoming's conservative values" and had "Wyoming's best interests at heart". She also claimed that Cheney's drive to "destroy President Trump" made her ineffective in Washington. Two other primary challengers dropped out and endorsed Hageman. She was quickly endorsed by Trump, who had personally interviewed several prospective primary challengers to Cheney.

Hageman and Cheney had been close political allies for several years. Hageman was an adviser to Cheney's brief 2014 Senate campaign, and introduced Cheney at a rally during Cheney's first congressional bid in 2016. According to Hageman, the relationship cooled when Cheney criticized Trump for not acting on claims that Russia put bounties on American troops in Afghanistan and chilled even further when Cheney called for Trump to acknowledge that he had lost the 2020 election. Hageman claimed that when Cheney called her to say that any claims about irregularities in the 2020 election were untrue, "that was probably the end of our relationship". She added that had she known that Cheney would have voted to impeach Trump, she "never would have answered [Cheney's] first phone call" in 2016. Hageman later claimed that Cheney and others had deceived her into opposing Trump but dismissed her previous opposition to Trump as "ancient history". In a statement to The New York Times, she called Trump "the greatest president of my lifetime."

Besides Trump, Hageman was endorsed by many other prominent Republicans, including House Minority Leader Kevin McCarthy. She also received campaign support from several Trump administration staffers, including Bill Stepien, Justin R. Clark, and Tim Murtaugh. In January 2022, it was reported that Hageman's campaign had raised $1 million, to Cheney's $4.5 million.

Hageman raced out to a large lead in opinion polling. A University of Wyoming poll taken a week before the election showed Hageman with a 29-point lead over Cheney. She defeated Cheney in the Republican primary in a landslide, winning 66.3% of the vote to Cheney's 28.9%. Hageman carried all but one county in the state, Cheney's home county of Teton County.

In the general election, Hageman faced Democratic nominee and Native American activist Lynnette Grey Bull, who was Cheney's opponent in 2020. Hageman was overwhelmingly favored. Republicans had a nearly 7-to-1 advantage in registration over Democrats, and Trump won the state in 2020 with 70% of the vote, his strongest state-level performance in the nation.

As expected, Hageman won the 2022 election handily, defeating Grey Bull, 67% to 24%. Upon taking office in 2023, she became the fourth consecutive Republican woman to represent Wyoming in the House. Barbara Cubin won the seat in 1994 and handed it to Cynthia Lummis in 2008, who handed it to Cheney in 2016.

Tenure 
In the contested 2023 Speaker of the United States House of Representatives election, though many of Hageman's colleagues in the Freedom Caucus refused to support Kevin McCarthy, Hageman backed him on every ballot.

Committee assignments 

 Committee on the Judiciary
 Committee on Natural Resources

Caucus memberships 
Freedom Caucus
Republican Study Committee

Political positions
Hageman calls herself an unyielding conservative. During her gubernatorial campaign, she claimed that government was too pervasive in American lives, to the point that it was replacing "community, the organizations you belong to, and family support." Along similar lines, during her congressional campaign, she highlighted her past work in "defending our great state against the excess of government". She argued that as part of her plan to "protect Wyoming", her priorities would be "energy independence, regulatory reform, restor[ing] power to the states, protection of our southern border and enforcement of our immigration laws." She added that while in Congress, she would "focus on what is in the best interest of the United States, and, specifically, what is in the best interest of Wyoming." Hageman is a vocal supporter of the fossil fuel industry, saying at an August 2022 campaign event that coal is an "affordable, clean, acceptable resource that we all should be using".

Syria
In 2023, Hageman was among 47 Republicans to vote in favor of H.Con.Res. 21 which directed President Joe Biden to remove U.S. troops from Syria within 180 days.

Personal life 
Hageman is married to Cheyenne-based malpractice attorney John Sundahl. Hageman is Protestant.

Electoral history

References

External links 

 Congresswoman Harriet Hageman official U.S. House website
 Harriet Hageman for Congress campaign website
 
 

|-

1962 births
21st-century American politicians
21st-century American women politicians
American lawyers
American Protestants
American women lawyers
Christians from Wyoming
Female members of the United States House of Representatives
Living people
People from Goshen County, Wyoming
Protestants from Wyoming
Republican Party members of the United States House of Representatives from Wyoming
University of Wyoming College of Law alumni
Women in Wyoming politics
Wyoming lawyers
Wyoming Republicans